The United States Golf Teachers Cup is the national championship event of the United States Golf Teachers Federation.  It is played annually at different venues around the United States, and is a 36-hole stroke-play event.  The championship is open to all members in good standing of the World Golf Teachers Federation.

Past champions
2021 Alejandro Duque
2020 No Tournament
2019 Hunter Huang
2018 Mark Harman
2017 Matt Smith
2016 Mark Harman
2015 Bill Hardwick
2014 David Belling
2013 Grant Gulych
2012 Bill Hardwick
2011 James Douris
2010 Christopher Richards
2009 James Douris
2008 Jerry Moore
2007 James Douris
2006 James Douris
2005 Mark Harman
2004 David Belling
2003 Mark Harman
2002 Mark Harman
2001 Mark Harman
2000 Mark Umphreyville
1999 Brian Lamberti
1998 Mark Harman
1997 Shawn Clement
1996 Edward Lee

References

External links 
 United States Golf Teachers Federation 
 World Golf Teachers Federation

Golf tournaments in the United States